Diospyros piscicapa is a tree in the family Ebenaceae. The twigs are stout and smooth. Male inflorescences feature one to three flowers with a tubular calyx. The fruit is locally used to stun fish. Habitat is lowland mixed dipterocarp forests from sea level to  altitude. D. piscicapa is endemic to Borneo.

References

piscicapa
Plants described in 1925
Endemic flora of Borneo
Trees of Borneo